Parley Birger Eugen Gulbrandsen (Chinese: , pinyin: , born October 30, 1889 in Christiania, died 1959 in Norway) was a Norwegian missionary to China affiliated with the Norwegian Evangelical Mission (NEM) which belonged to the Pentecostal movement. He was the brother of Henry Gulbrandsen, who was also a missionary to China.  

After coming in contact with a Pentecostal meeting at the Filadelfia Assembly in Christiania, Gulbrandsen studied their teachings at the mission's home in Stabekk in 1909. Afterwards he studied at the Bible Training Institute in Glasgow, Scotland. In September 1910, he went to China, and worked in the North Chihli Mission in North Zhili (romanized as Chihli at the time) until 1914. He was active in the Longmen district. In 1916, he joined the Norwegian Free Evangelical Mission Association (NFEH), launched by the Pentecostal movement in Norway the previous year. When this mission was dissolved in 1934, the former Norwegian missionaries of the NFEH were directly supported by local churches in Norway. Parley Gulbrandsen was in charge for the work at Xinbao'an in Zhili (later part of Chahar). This work, which was begun in 1916, became known as the Norwegian mission in Sinpaoan. In Norway, the work was supported by the Filadelfia church at  24 in Oslo. Gulbrandsen later worked in the Xuanhua District, Longguan and Beijing. He returned to Norway in 1948; he was awarded the King's Medal of Merit in 1952. Gulbrandsen died in 1959. 

Parley Gulbrandsen married Christina "Chrissie" Beruldsen in China in 1911.

Works 
Greetings from China, 1926
Thoughts about the outer mission and a brief overview of Pentecostal mission field Oslo: Filadelfia, 1939

Literature 
 Johansen, Oddvar; Hagen, Kjell; Nyen, Astrid Neema; Kolbjørnsrud, Paul and Filberg, Trond. 2010.  De norske pinsemenigheters ytremisjon (PYM).
Norsk Misjonsleksikon, Volume 2, sp. 143.

Notes, references, and further reading

External links
Revival in Norway and Denmark

Norwegian expatriates in China
1959 deaths
1889 births
Norwegian Protestant missionaries
Protestant missionaries in China
Norwegian Pentecostal missionaries